Ray Charles at Newport is a 1958 live album of Ray Charles' July 5, 1958 performance at the Newport Jazz Festival. The detailed liner notes on the album were written by Kenneth Lee Karpe. All tracks from this Newport album, along with all tracks from his 1959 Herndon Stadium performance in Atlanta, were also released on the Atlantic compilation LP Ray Charles Live.  A later CD reissue of that compilation album included a previously unissued song from the 1958 Newport concert, "Swanee River Rock".

Track listing
All tracks composed by Ray Charles, except where indicated

Personnel
 Ray Charles – keyboards, piano, lead vocals
 Marcus Belgrave – trumpet
 Lee Harper – trumpet
 David "Fathead" Newman – tenor saxophone
 Bennie Crawford – alto saxophone, baritone saxophone
 Edgar Willis – bass
 Richie Goldberg – drums
 Marjorie Hendricks – vocals on "The Right Time"
 The Raelettes – backing vocals
Technical
 Tom Dowd, Harold Chapman – recording engineer
 Marvin Israel - cover design
 Lee Friedlander - cover photography

References
Citations

Sources
Atlantic 1289

External links
Ray Charles Video Museum
It's All About Ray

Ray Charles live albums
Albums recorded at the Newport Jazz Festival
1959 live albums
Atlantic Records live albums
1958 in Rhode Island